WTGA (1590 AM) was a radio station broadcasting a Soft Adult Contemporary format. Licensed to Thomaston, Georgia, United States, the station was owned by Radio Georgia, Inc. and featured programming from AP Radio and Jones Radio Network.

References

External links

TGA
Defunct radio stations in the United States
Radio stations disestablished in 2015
2015 disestablishments in Georgia (U.S. state)
TGA